UIC Skyspace is a skyspace by James Turrell located at the southwest corner of Roosevelt Road and Halsted Street in Chicago.    The sculpture was created in 2005 as part of the creation of the South Campus of the University of Illinois at Chicago.  The sculpture and a fountain are located in the middle of Earl Neal Plaza, named for the lawyer who was instrumental in coordinating the development of the South Campus.

References

University of Illinois Chicago
Works by James Turrell
Installation art works